David Lawrence Morril (June 10, 1772January 28, 1849) was an American politician, attorney, physician and minister. He served as a U.S. Senator for New Hampshire from 1817 to 1823, and was the tenth governor of New Hampshire, serving from 1824 until 1827.

Early life
Morril was born to Samuel and Anna (Lawrence) Morril in Epping in the Province of New Hampshire on June 10, 1772. He graduated from Phillips Exeter Academy and Dartmouth College, and later received his law degree from the University of Vermont.

He worked as a clergyman, called to the Congregational Presbyterian Church in 1802 in Goffstown, New Hampshire, where he served for years.

Political career
In 1808, Morril was elected as a member of the New Hampshire House of Representatives; he served until 1816. In his last term in 1816, he was elected by the House as Speaker.

The legislature elected him as the U.S. Senator from New Hampshire in 1817, and he served until 1823.

In 1824 Morril was elected as Governor of New Hampshire, serving from June 3, 1824 to June 7, 1827. In the 1824 election, Morril received the most votes; however, because he failed to win a majority of the votes cast, the election had to be decided by the legislature. Morril was elected by a vote of 163 to 43 during a joint meeting of the New Hampshire legislature.  In the 1825 election, Morril ran unopposed; in the 1826 election, Morril defeated his opponent Benjamin Pierce by 5,392 votes.  In the 1827 election, Morril was defeated by Pierce by an overwhelming margin: Benjamin Pierce won 21,166 votes out of 27,411 cast.

Personal life

Morril married Lydia Poor in 1824 and they had four children together.

He is buried in the Old North Cemetery, Concord, New Hampshire, near the grave of President Franklin Pierce.

Notes

External links
Biographic sketch at U.S. Congress website

1772 births
1849 deaths
People from Epping, New Hampshire
American Presbyterians
New Hampshire Democratic-Republicans
Governors of New Hampshire
United States senators from New Hampshire
University of Vermont alumni
Democratic-Republican Party United States senators
Members of the New Hampshire House of Representatives
Speakers of the New Hampshire House of Representatives
Democratic-Republican Party state governors of the United States
Phillips Exeter Academy alumni